The Râmna is a right tributary of the river Putna in Romania. It discharges into the Putna near Răstoaca.

References

Rivers of Romania
Rivers of Vrancea County